The Bushmaster Arm Pistol was a 5.56×45mm NATO firearm, categorizeable as either a long pistol (under the American legal definition of a pistol) or compact carbine rifle, produced by the Gwinn Firearms Company, and later Bushmaster Firearms Inc. The firearm was a new design, having a tipping-block bolt system combined with a long stroke piston system similar to the AK-47 rifle.

Some AR-15 parts were used in its construction and it used STANAG type magazines.

Production ceased in 1988 for the pistol variant and 1991 for the rifle following Bushmaster's acquisition by the Quality Products Company the previous year; the company now known as Bushmaster is primarily known for making the more common AR-15 type rifles.

See also
List of bullpup firearms

References

External links 
Bushmaster Arm Pistol at BiggerHammer.net
Bushmaster Official site

Bullpup personal defense weapons
Personal defense weapons
5.56 mm firearms
Rifles of the United States
Bushmaster firearms